Mount Wellington is a mountain located in the Central New York Region of New York. It is located south of the Hamlet of Springfield Center at the northern end of Otsego Lake. The extreme southern point of the mountain is called Clarke Point and also referred to as the Shad Cam. It is known as "The Sleeping Lion", as it looks similar to a lion laying down, viewed from Cooperstown, New York. It was originally named Mount Millington, but was renamed by George Hyde Clarke in honor of Field Marshal The 1st Duke of Wellington, the victor of Waterloo, who had been Clarke's schoolmate at Eton College in England.

References

Mountains of Otsego County, New York
Mountains of New York (state)